Markuelia is a genus of fossil worm-like bilaterian animals allied to Ecdysozoa and known from strata of Lower Cambrian to Lower Ordovician age containing five species.

An advanced X-ray imaging technique called X-ray tomographic microscopy has been applied to splendidly preserved, uncrushed  Markuelia fossils found in Hunan province in southern China and in eastern Siberia. When details in features smaller than one micrometre across can be observed, these fossils are seen to represent many developmental stages, from the first cell divisions to the time of hatching; therefore they offer a unique opportunity to study the development of Lower Cambrian animals.

The features observed indicate that the genus had a mouth surrounded by a ring of teeth, an alimentary canal, and an anus.

However the characters preserved are inconclusive regarding the genus' taxonomic affinity; it can at best be placed in the scalidophoran total group, since it is currently impossible to ally it with the Priapulids or other scalidophora.

Further reading

References

Geotimes"Fossil embryos exposed in 3-D" October 2006
Dr Philip Donoghue, "Markuelia"

Prehistoric protostome genera
Cambrian invertebrates
Cambrian first appearances
Ordovician extinctions
Fossils of China
Fossils of Russia